Horizon Zero Dawn is a 2017 action role-playing game  developed by Guerrilla Games and published by Sony Interactive Entertainment. It is the first game of the Horizon video game series. The plot follows Aloy, a young hunter in a world overrun by machines, who sets out to uncover her past. The player uses ranged weapons, a spear, and stealth to combat mechanical creatures and other enemy forces. A skill tree provides the player with new abilities and bonuses. The player can explore the open world to discover locations and take on side quests. It is the first game in the Horizon series and was released for the PlayStation 4 in 2017 and Windows in 2020.

Horizon Zero Dawn is Guerrilla Games' first intellectual property since Killzone in 2004 and its first role-playing video game.  Development began in 2011 after the completion of Killzone 3, with director Mathijs de Jonge considering it the riskiest idea pitched at the time. The game engine, Decima, was developed for Killzone: Shadow Fall and altered for Horizon Zero Dawn. Being set in a post-apocalyptic setting, anthropologists were consulted to authenticate the world's decay over a millennium. The soundtrack was led by composer Joris de Man, featuring contributions from The Flight.

Horizon Zero Dawn was praised by critics for its open world, story, visuals, combat, characterization, and the performance of voice actress Ashly Burch; however, the dialogue, melee combat, and character models received some criticism. The game won numerous awards and sold over 20 million copies by February 2022, making it one of the best-selling PlayStation 4 games. An expansion, The Frozen Wilds, was released in November 2017. A sequel, Horizon Forbidden West, was released for the PlayStation 4 and PlayStation 5 on 18 February 2022. A television series is in development at Netflix.

Gameplay

Horizon Zero Dawn is an action role-playing game played from a third-person view. Players take control of Aloy, a hunter who ventures through a post-apocalyptic land ruled by robotic creatures. Aloy can kill enemies in a variety of ways – shooting them with arrows, setting traps such as tripwires using the Tripcaster, using explosives, and a spear. Machine components, including electricity and the metal they are composed of, are vital to Aloy's survival; she can loot their remains for crafting resources. Ammo, resource satchels, pouches, quivers, resistance, antidotes, health potions, and traps can all be crafted. Weapons have modification slots for dealing more damage. Aloy wears a Focus, a small head piece that scans machines to determine their susceptibilities, identify their location, their level, and the nature of loot they will drop. One machine, the Stalker, can enable cloaking technology to avert the gaze of Aloy's Focus scan. Machines attack with defensive and offensive measures, and in either case react to a perceived threat by charging at it with brute force or projectiles. Exhibiting the behaviour of wild animals, some machines are inclined to move in herds, and others, with the ability to fly, do so in flocks. Unless hacked with the Override Tool, or sufficiently hit with corruption arrows, machines do not exert aggressive force against each other. Aloy also engages in battle with human enemies, such as bandits and the Eclipse cult.

Aloy can dodge, sprint, slide, or roll to evade her enemies' advances. Hiding in foliage to ambush nearby enemies can ensure immediate takedowns. Swimming may reach enemies stealthily or places otherwise unreachable on foot. She is able to hack a selection of machines with the Override Tool, some of which can be turned into makeshift mounts. Explorable ruins called Cauldrons unlock additional machines to override. Three categories occur in the skill tree: "Prowler" concerns stealth, "Brave" improves combat, and "Forager" increases healing and gathering capabilities. To level up, Aloy attains experience points from individual kills and completing quests. Upgrades in each category result in more adept use of the skills learned, with "Prowler" leading to silent takedowns, "Brave" to aiming a bow in slow motion, and "Forager" to an enlarged medicine pouch. The Frozen Wilds added "Traveler", which unlocks the ability to jump off a mount to attack enemies. The game has a seamless open world with a day-night cycle and dynamic weather system.

The map is composed of forest, jungle, desert, and snowy mountain regions. Mountainous terrain is traversed with the employment of parkour, and aided by the use of zip-lines. Corrupted Zones constitute areas that heighten difficulty and are populated by corrupted machines that behave with more aggression. To uncover more of the map, Aloy must scale large giraffe-like machines known as Tallnecks. Twenty-five robotic creature designs are present in the game. Save points and fast travel can be accessed by interacting with campfires, once discovered. The quest structure unfolds to accommodate the exploration of tribes, while the main story covers the entire world. Side quests involve Aloy completing tasks, like gathering materials, coming to the aid of individuals in danger of being killed, solving mysteries, assuming control of bandit camps, eliminating criminals and more difficult machines, accomplishing various challenges at any of the five Hunting Grounds, and obtaining an ancient armour that makes Aloy almost impervious to damage. A dialogue wheel is used to communicate with non-player characters. Collectibles include vantages that offer visual information of the Old World, metal flowers that contain poetry, and old relics, such as ancient mugs and tribal artifacts.

Synopsis

Setting
The story is set in a post-apocalyptic United States, between the states of Colorado, Wyoming and Utah, in the 31st century. Humans live in scattered, primitive tribes with varying levels of technological development. Their technologically advanced predecessors are remembered as the "Old Ones". Large robotic creatures, known as "machines", dominate the Earth. For the most part, they peacefully coexist with humans, who occasionally hunt them for parts. However, a phenomenon known as the "Derangement" has caused machines to become more aggressive towards humans, and larger and deadlier machines have begun to appear. There are four tribes that are prominently featured: the Nora, the Banuk, the Carja and the Oseram. The Nora are fierce matriarchal hunter-gatherers who live in the mountains and worship their deity, the "All-Mother". The Carja are an empire of desert-dwelling city builders who worship the Sun. The Banuk consist of wandering clans made up of hunters and shamans who live in snowy mountains (Montana's Yellowstone National Park) and worship the "blue light" of the machines. The Oseram are tinkerers and salvagers known for their advanced weapons, metalworking, brewing, and talent as warriors.

Plot
Aloy (Ashly Burch) is cast out from the Nora tribe at birth and raised by a fellow outcast named Rost (JB Blanc). As a child (Ava Potter), Aloy obtains a Focus, an augmented reality device that gives her special perceptive abilities. Aloy becomes curious about her origins and is told by Rost that if she wins the Proving, a competition to earn the right to become a member of the Nora, the tribe's Matriarchs might concede this information. Aloy spends some years training in combat and survival under Rost's instruction.

After coming of age, Aloy takes part in the Proving; she wins the competition, but the Nora are attacked by masked cultists. Rost sacrifices himself to save Aloy from their leader, Helis (Crispin Freeman). When Aloy awakens, the Matriarchs explain that Aloy was found as an infant before a sealed door within the Nora's sacred mountain, and that these suspicious origins were the reason for being outcast. The Matriarchs name Aloy a "Seeker", allowing her to leave their lands in pursuit of the cultists. Aloy eventually learns that the cultists are part of a splinter Carja faction called the Eclipse, and that Aloy was targeted due to her resemblance to an Old World scientist named Elisabet Sobeck (also voiced by Burch). Aloy locates the ruined corporate campus of Faro Automated Solutions and discovers that the Old World was destroyed nearly a thousand years ago after Faro lost control of its automated peacekeeper military robots. The robots, which could self-replicate and consumed biomass, overran the planet and consumed the biosphere, stripping Earth of life. Zero Dawn, a project spearheaded by Sobeck, was initiated to create an automated terraforming system to deactivate the robots and restore life to Earth.

Aloy is contacted by Sylens (Lance Reddick), a secretive Banuk figure interested in uncovering the fate of the Old Ones. Aloy learns that Sobeck was sent to a decommissioned Orbital Launch Base to complete Zero Dawn, which is located under the Citadel, the centre of Eclipse power. Inside the base, Aloy learns that Zero Dawn was a vast underground system of databases, factories, and cloning facilities controlled by a single artificial intelligence, GAIA (Lesley Ewen) and her subsystems. Once all life had been extinguished, GAIA developed a countermeasure to deactivate the Faro robots and build her own animalistic machines to restore the Earth's biosphere. Once the planet was habitable again, GAIA's next goal was to reseed life on Earth based on stored DNA and teach the first human clones not to repeat their predecessors' mistakes. However, APOLLO, the subsystem designed to teach humanity, was sabotaged by Faro's founder and CEO Theodore Faro in a fit of nihilism, and the new generation of humans were reduced to a tribal, subsistence society. The Eclipse are secretly controlled by HADES (John Gonzalez), another of GAIA's subsystems designed to enact controlled extinction if the outcome of Zero Dawn was not favorable for human existence. Reaching Sobeck's office, Aloy obtains a registry to give her access to the door beneath the Nora's mountain. She is captured by Helis and sentenced to death at the Citadel, but escapes with the help of Sylens. Aloy helps the Nora fight off the Eclipse and unlocks the mountain's door.

She finds a recording from GAIA, revealing that a signal of unknown origin caused HADES to activate and seize control of her functions; as a last resort, GAIA self-destructed in order to stop HADES, but sadly failed and lost control of the other subsystems. Without GAIA to maintain the terraforming process, the entire system began to break down, leading to the Derangement. As a contingency plan, GAIA created a clone of Sobeck in the form of Aloy, in the hope that she would find GAIA's message, destroy HADES, and restore GAIA's functions. Aloy learns that Sobeck sacrificed her life to ensure the Faro robots would not find GAIA. Aloy manages to obtain the master override to destroy HADES. Sylens reveals that he was the founder of the Eclipse, originally tempted by HADES' promises of knowledge when he discovered it. They surmise that HADES intends to send a signal to reactivate the Faro robots to extinguish life on Earth. Aloy kills Helis and helps fight off machines, before stabbing HADES and activating the master override, ending the war. She journeys to Sobeck's old home, finding her corpse, and mourns her predecessor. In a post-credits scene, HADES is trapped by Sylens, who intends to interrogate HADES to find out who sent the signal that activated it.

The Frozen Wilds
Aloy travels to the "Cut", the home of the Banuk tribe, after hearing word of dangerous machines appearing and a mountain belching smoke. She learns from Aratak (Richard Neil), chieftain of the largest Banuk clan, that the Banuk have been attempting to battle a "Daemon" on the mountain, "Thunder's Drum", which has corrupted the machines of the Cut. However, their first attack had been a failure, and their shaman, Ourea, had disappeared afterwards. Aloy searches for Ourea, coming across strange robotic towers which both control and repair the corrupted machines. She finds Ourea (Necar Zadegan) in an Old World facility that had been converted into a Banuk shrine and is housing an artificial intelligence the shaman calls the "Spirit". Aloy is able to make contact with the Spirit, which warns Ourea that the Daemon is blocking its transmissions before being cut off. Aloy and Ourea agree to work together to save the Spirit. Per Ourea's advice, Aloy defeats Aratak in a hunting competition, taking his place as chieftain. She also discovers that Aratak and Ourea are siblings.

Aloy, Ourea, and Aratak head for Thunder's Drum. They infiltrate the Old World facility built inside the mountain, where Aloy discovers that the Spirit is actually CYAN (Laurel Lefkow), a highly advanced AI designed to prevent the Yellowstone Caldera from erupting. Traveling further inside, they discover that the Daemon has already overtaken much of the facility, but CYAN suggests using lava from the caldera to destroy the infected areas while preserving the facility. It is also revealed that the Daemon is in fact HEPHAESTUS (Stefan Ashton Frank), another of GAIA's subsystems that manufactures machines. The group fights through HEPHAESTUS' defenses and Ourea sacrifices herself to override CYAN's core, allowing it to escape. CYAN transfers its core systems to an auxiliary data center and initiates self-destruction of the facility. Aloy and Aratak narrowly escape. Aloy returns to the Banuk Shrine, where CYAN is waiting; the AI provides additional information about the Old World but warns that HEPHAESTUS is still active somewhere and will continue to build machines designed specifically to kill humans, which is why it tried to seize control of CYAN and its facilities. Returning Aratak to his previous position as Chieftain, Aloy departs the Cut.

Development
Guerrilla Games began developing Horizon Zero Dawn following the release of Killzone 3 in 2011. When conceiving the idea for a new game, about 40 concepts were pitched. Among these was Horizon Zero Dawn, which game director Mathijs de Jonge considered "the most risky" of the concepts and was pitched in 2010 by art director Jan-Bart van Beek. When this concept was chosen, a team of 10–20 began building prototypes of the game. Approximately 20 different stories were written for the game, exploring varying concepts for the game, such as different player characters. John Gonzalez, who previously acted as lead writer for Fallout: New Vegas (2010), was hired to write the game's story as narrative director, with Ben McCaw as lead writer. The main elements of the story and the character of Aloy remained intact since early development. Upon the completion of Killzone: Shadow Fall in late 2013, the remainder of the staff began working on Horizon Zero Dawn. Guerrilla cancelled another game to allow the entire team to focus on the development of Horizon. Sony would later admit to being reluctant about having the main character be female and conducted focus testing to see if such a decision was marketable. The game had an estimated budget of over 45 million.

The game's concept explores the juxtaposition between the danger and beauty of the world, particularly analysing the concept of humanity not being the dominant species. The team aimed to emphasise the game's exploration element by featuring a quest system, as well as including items throughout the world that can be used to craft or replenish health. The team wished for the game to have a simple user interface design, specifically avoiding complicated menus for crafting, and considered the game to be a technical challenge. They felt that the game engine, Decima, which was designed for games such as the Killzone series and was previously used for Killzone: Shadow Fall, was difficult to alter for Horizon, in terms of draw distance and loading. To discover how some game elements work differently in open world games, the team sought help from talent in the design, art and technical fields. In extrapolating the game world, Guerrilla turned to anthropologists and researched the formation of tribal cultures as well as how building materials would decay over a millennium. The game's quest system and narrative design took inspiration from other role-playing video games, ranging from the "Relaxed" quest design of RPG Maker games to the "Strict" quest design of hack and slash games. They defined "Relaxed" quest design as having few centralised systems for managing quest progression, and "Strict" quest design as having a rigid structure and predefined elements, with the team deciding the latter.

Lance Reddick and Ashly Burch's involvement was revealed in January 2017. Burch voiced Aloy, whose likeness was portrayed by Hannah Hoekstra and motion capture was performed by Amanda Piery in London. Following an auditioning process in 2014, Burch was called in to do the E3 2015 trailer and proceeded to work on the game for two years in Los Angeles, providing facial motion capture as well.

The game's soundtrack was composed by Joris de Man, The Flight, Niels van der Leest, and Jonathan Williams, with vocalist Julie Elven serving as the primary performer. Lucas van Tol, music supervisor and senior sound designer, provided the composers with a game design document, insisting on an intimate sound for the score. For the tribal theme, they experimented with bows on piano wire and resonator guitars (with layered tracks of harmonicas on top of the latter) and playing cellos with plectrums or the back of a bow to convey how contemporary instruments would be played by someone to whom the instruments were unknown; de Man also used a contrabass flute and made synth pads from blowing on a Thai bamboo flute, noting "distant pads and ambiences, and wide, spread out chords seemed to work well". Circuit-bent synthesizers and percussive loops, run through impulse responses of metal and iron being beaten, were devoted to making a thematic identifier for the machines based on technology and metal. Van Tol required that the music be supplied in stems so that different pieces could be combined. The positive response to the first E3 trailer's main theme led it to be included in the main menu. The composers also did the motion capture for diegetic music vignettes, portraying in-game tribal musicians. The four-hour soundtrack was released via digital music platforms on 10 March 2017.

Release
The concept art as well as the game's codename, Horizon, were leaked in September 2014. Horizon Zero Dawn was officially announced during Sony's E3 2015 press conference. The game was featured as the cover story in the September 2015 issue of Edge and the October 2016 issue of Game Informer. At E3 2016, Sony had a life-sized cosplay version of one of the machines greet the trade show attendees. Originally set to be released in 2016, the game was delayed to February 2017 to be further polished. It was released to manufacturing in late January 2017, and launched to North American markets on 28 February 2017, in Europe, Australia and New Zealand on 1 March and Asia on 2 March for the PlayStation 4. Horizon Zero Dawn is forward compatible with the PS4 Pro, allowing it to run up to 4K resolution. In April 2017, a making-of documentary was released on Dutch public television. By March 2017, a story expansion had already been set in motion. New Game Plus, an Ultra Hard difficulty mode, additional trophies and aesthetic features were introduced with a patch released in July 2017. The expansion, The Frozen Wilds, was released on 7 November 2017. The Complete Edition, which contains the base game, The Frozen Wilds, and all additional downloadable content (DLC), was released for the PlayStation 4 on 5 December 2017 and Windows via Steam on 7 August 2020 and GOG on 24 November 2020. A tabletop game adaptation is being developed by Steamforged Games.

Reception

Horizon Zero Dawn received "generally favorable" reviews from critics, according to review aggregator Metacritic. Destructoids Chris Carter commended Ashly Burch and Lance Reddick for their performances, with the character of Aloy receiving credit for maintaining a "captivating" and "interesting" consistency in the narrative and action sequences. Carter also lauded the focus on exploration and discovery, which he said grew more effective as he traversed more of the land. The game world itself was subject to compliment for its "beautiful" day-night cycle and weather system. According to Carter, the challenging nature of the machines and varied methods with which to battle them brought a real sense of fun to the combat. Matt Buchholtz of EGMNow likewise praised Burch as well as the game world, which he found to be mesmerising. Considered the most powerful part of the game, the Focus feature gained approval for complementing the combat in a way that "forces you to become a hunter". Writing for Game Informer, Jeff Marchiafava opined that, unlike with other open world video games, searching for audio logs and emails provided the plot with a "remarkable sense of discovery". He was thankful that story-based missions dominated the overall experience, arguing that they worked to detail the world and inspired gameplay variation.

Peter Brown at GameSpot reflected on Aloy's character development with amazement. One constant thrill to Brown came from combating the machines, which he said took the spotlight and never lost its flair. He appreciated also that the main quests encouraged one to explore the environment. Zoe Delahunty-Light, writing for GamesRadar+, was fascinated with the intricacies of the world and found integral value in the lore scattered among the ruins. She echoed Brown's view that fighting machines maintained excitement throughout. Giant Bomb's Jeff Gerstmann declared Horizon Zero Dawn as "a near-perfect story" with a satisfying conclusion, and emphasised that it contained substantial depth. Lucy O'Brien at IGN admired its weight in meaning, while welcoming the charm of the protagonist's personality. A considerable impression was made with the combat, which was stated as the most compelling accomplishment. Writing for Polygon, Philip Kollar applauded the game as what he dubbed the "refutation" of Guerrilla Games' past work, a change of pace he described as "refreshing". Aloy was observed to be perfectly coupled with the story in that she offered the curiosity to seek out its many mysteries. Kollar perceived the Focus as "key to combat" and the machines as engaging foes in battle. Colm Ahern of VideoGamer.com wrote in his verdict, "Destroying large robot beasts while frantically switching between weapons is intoxicating, but the strength of Horizon Zero Dawn is in Aloy's engaging quest to find out who she really is".

Conversely, Carter saw the characters beyond Aloy and Sylens as uninteresting and bland in their designs. He also disparaged the human artificial intelligence as being worse than that of the machines. To Buchholtz, the weapon system in relation to ammunition appeared convoluted; the ability to only purchase one item at a time "a massive oversight"; and Aloy's ability to only grab marked ledges was confusing for a "parkour master". Marchiafava's only major criticism was that it held too familiar roots with established open world formula. Although Brown drew enjoyment from other aspects of combat, he disparaged the melee for its ineffectiveness and simplicity. Delahunty-Light concurred that the melee fell short of its potential, and also took issue with the jumping mechanic. O'Brien felt the dialogue occasionally contradicted the otherwise intelligent narrative. Kollar bemoaned the character models as its one visual shortcoming.

Game director Yoko Taro listed it as one of his favourite PlayStation 4 games. Entertainment Weekly ranked it as the fourth best game of 2017, GamesRadar+ ranked it second on their list of the 25 Best Games of 2017, and Eurogamer ranked it 31st on their list of the "Top 50 Games of 2017". The Verge named Horizon Zero Dawn as one of the 15 Best Games of 2017. In Game Informers Reader's Choice Best of 2017 Awards, it took the lead for "Best Sony Game", coming up in second place for both "Best Action Game" and "Game of the Year". Game Informer also awarded it "Best Sony Exclusive" in their Best of 2017 Awards, and also gave it the awards for "Best Story" and "Best Character" (Aloy) in their 2017 Action Game of the Year Awards. EGMNow ranked the game third in their list of 25 Best Games of 2017, while Polygon ranked it eighth on their list of the 50 best games of 2017. The game won the Gold Prize and Users Choice Prize at the 2017 PlayStation Awards. It was nominated for "Best PS4 Game" at Destructoids Game of the Year Awards 2017. It also won the awards for "Best PlayStation 4 Game" and "Best Graphics" at IGNs Best of 2017 Awards, whereas its other nominations were for "Game of the Year", "Best Action-Adventure Game", and "Best Art Direction". It was nominated for "Best Looking Game" at Giant Bombs 2017 Game of the Year Awards. In 2018, it won the awards for Best PS4 Game, Best Performance for Ashly Burch, Best Art Direction, Best Soundtrack, Best Story, Best Post-Release Content, Best PlayStation Console Exclusive, and Best Use of PS4 Pro at PlayStation Blog's Game of the Year Awards.

Sales
Horizon Zero Dawn was the best-selling game during its release week in the UK. It surpassed No Man's Sky as the biggest launch of a new intellectual property on the PlayStation 4 and was the most successful launch of any kind on the platform since Uncharted 4: A Thief's End, as well as Guerrilla Games' biggest debut to date. The game sold close to 117,000 copies in its first week in Japan, becoming the second best-selling game that week. Horizon Zero Dawn was the second most downloaded game on the North American PlayStation Store for February. Because its launch day occurred on the last day of February, only one day of sales was counted. Within two weeks it sold 2.6 million units.

It was the best-selling game in its week of release in Australia. In March 2017, it was the second best-selling game in the UK and the highest-selling PlayStation 4 game. Horizon Zero Dawn was also the best-selling game on PlayStation Store that month. It was ranked number one in the UK sales chart in April 2017, while hitting eighth place in the Japanese chart. By February 2018, over 7.6 million copies had been sold, increasing to over 10 million a year later, making it one of the best-selling PlayStation 4 games. By February 2022, over 20 million copies sold in PlayStation 4 and Windows platforms.

In an effort to increase profitability, in 2020 Sony decided to begin porting their first-party titles to PC. Horizon Zero Dawn released on PC in August 2020 and had a successful launch, moving over 700,000 digital copies.  By March 2022, that number had increased to about 2.4 million copies.

In February 2022, Hermen Hulst announced via his Twitter account that the game had sold over 20 million copies as of 28 November 2021.

Awards

Sequel and spin-offs

In June 2020, Guerrilla announced a sequel titled Horizon Forbidden West. It was released on February 18, 2022. A spin-off, Horizon Call of the Mountain was announced in January 2022 and is slated to release in February 2023. A second, multiplayer-oriented spin-off was confirmed in December 2022.

Notes

References

External links

 
 
 

2017 video games
Action role-playing video games
Augmented reality in fiction
BAFTA winners (video games)
Decima (game engine) games
Dystopian video games
Fiction set in the 4th millennium
Genocide in fiction
Guerrilla Games games
Horizon Zero Dawn
Hunting in video games
Interactive Achievement Award winners
Ivor Novello Award winners
Nixxes Software games
Open-world video games
PlayStation 4 Pro enhanced games
PlayStation 4 games
PlayStation 5 enhanced games
PlayStation Network games
Post-apocalyptic video games
Science fiction video games
Single-player video games
Sony Interactive Entertainment games
Video games about artificial intelligence
Video games about cloning
Video games about robots
Video games adapted into television shows
Video games developed in the Netherlands
Video games featuring female protagonists
Video games scored by Joris de Man
Video games set in Arizona
Video games set in Colorado
Video games set in Denver
Video games set in Idaho
Video games set in Montana
Video games set in Utah
Video games set in Wyoming
Video games set in the 31st century
Video games set in the future
Virtuos games
Windows games